Gordon S. Holder was a vice admiral in the United States Navy.  He was a senior vice president at Booz Allen Hamilton.

Prior to his retirement from the Navy, Holder served as commander of the Military Sealift Command. He also served as commander of the Naval Doctrine Command.

Holder started his navy career by graduating from Navy Officer Candidate School in Newport, RI in October 1968. He served in the U.S. Navy from 1968 thru 2004. He was in charge  of strategic logistics and warfighting efforts for Booz Allen Hamilton.

Education
 Bachelor's degree in Music Education from Florida State University.
 Master's degree in personnel counseling from Troy University.

References

External links

Official Navy Profile 
Booz Allen Profile

1946 births
Living people
Florida State University alumni
Troy University alumni
United States Navy admirals
Recipients of the Legion of Merit
Recipients of the Meritorious Service Medal (United States)